Drexel 5856 is a music manuscript containing works composed by George Frideric Handel. It is a significant primary source of the composer's work, having been copied by one of Handel's frequent copyists, John Christopher Smith, possibly as a presentation copy.

Belonging to the New York Public Library, it forms part of the Music Division's Drexel Collection, located at the New York Public Library for the Performing Arts. Following traditional library practice, its name is derived from its call number.

Date
Drexel 5856 dates from 1720-1721. Most of Handel's keyboard music was composed in the decade 1710-1720, an observation we know from a study of his handwriting and paper studies. John Christopher Smith became Handel's copyist beginning in the years 1716-1717. Along with two other manuscript, Terence Best surmises that Drexel 5856 was prepared for a patron who was a friend of the composer.

Provenance

The earliest known owner of Drexel 5856 was the composer John Stafford Smith, who also was as an antiquarian and collector of manuscripts. He presented it as a gift to Charles Wesley, possibly in 1813. This much of the provenance is known from Wesley's inscription on the volume's initial leaf:

Below Wesley's writing is an inscription from the subsequent owner Edward Francis Rimbault, who wrote:

Rimbault stated that he believed the manuscript to have been copied for Princess Amelia of Great Britain. He based this idea on having seen a book "Books in ye closet at Gunnersbury." (No contemporary musicologists repeat this assertion. Rimbault's findings are occasionally faulty; see Drexel 4180—4185 for examples of his conclusions that are consider doubtful.)

After Rimbault's death in 1876, the manuscript was listed as lot 1366 in the 1877 auction catalog of his estate (the number 1366 can be seen in the upper left corner of the initial leaf).  The manuscript was one of about 600 lots purchased by Philadelphia-born financier Joseph W. Drexel, who had already amassed a large music library. Upon Drexel's death, he bequeathed his music library to The Lenox Library. When the Lenox Library merged with the Astor Library to become the New York Public Library, the Drexel Collection became the basis for one of its founding units, the Music Division. Today, Drexel 5856 is part of the Drexel Collection in the Music Division, now located at the New York Public Library for the Performing Arts at Lincoln Center.

Content

Although no scholars have written about the manuscript as a whole, the editors of the Hallische Händel-Ausgabe were well-aware of Drexel 5856. It is included in a list of significant sources of Handel's keyboard works in the Händel-Werke-Verzeichnis, the thematic catalog of Handel's works. The thematic catalog attests that Drexel 5856 was used in editing the critical editions of those works included in the manuscript.

Christopher Hogwood consulted the manuscript when working on his book Handel : Water Music and Music for the Royal Fireworks.

In his review of a 1986 edition of Handel's harpsichord suites, Terence Best criticized the editor for not including "important" sources, mentioning Drexel 5856 as one of those sources.

Contents

Works consulted

 (JSTOR access by subscription)

External links
NYPL catalog record
RISM: https://opac.rism.info/search?id=000102204 (Drexel 5856 entry in the RISM database)

Notes

17th-century manuscripts
Baroque music manuscript sources
English manuscripts
George Frideric Handel
Manuscripts in the New York Public Library
Music anthologies